Japanese Lighthouse may refer to:
Japanese Lighthouse (Poluwat, Chuuk), listed on the United States National Register of Historic Places in Chuuk, Federated States of Micronesia
Japanese Lighthouse (Garapan, Saipan), listed on the U.S. National Register of Historic Places in Saipan, Northern Mariana Islands